San Fernando de Monte Cristi is the capital town of Monte Cristi Province in the Dominican Republic. It is located in the northwest region of the country in a coastal area above the border with Haiti.

History 
Monte Cristi was founded by Nicolás de Ovando in 1506 and populated in 1533 by Juan de Bolaños and 63 families from the Canary Islands. These migrated to various parts of the country afterwards leaving the town behind. It was later repopulated and became a very wealthy port in the mid-to-late 16th century.

In 1606, one hundred years after its founding, it was destroyed as retribution for doing business with pirates. In 1756 the city was rebuilt and again became a prosperous trading center, until  the early 20th century.

In 1895, it was the site of the signing of the Manifesto of Montecristi by Máximo Gómez and José Martí, at the Gómez home on Mella St. They sailed from "La Granja" beach, also in Monte Cristi, to Cuba to fight for its independence.

Santiago-born educator and feminist Rosa Smester Marrero moved to Monte Cristi in 1913, becoming a teacher of the Higher Normal School of Montecristi and directing the Higher School of Ladies of Montecristi.

Climate 
Monte Cristi has a hot semi-arid climate (Köppen: BSh) with a pronounced dry season in the summer, and a wet season in the winter. Precipitation is highest in the eastern part of the park where the winds collide with the Northern Range and discharge their waters. The same applies to the area of Manzanillo. The same winds hit the Central Cordillera and its extension, the Massif du Nord in Haiti. The effect is felt mainly in the foothills near Loma de Cabrera and Dajabón, and to a lesser extent in Manzanillo.

Hurricanes and tropical storms have little effect on the area of Monte Cristi, however, they can cause increased rains and flooding in the Yaque del Norte River, which brings sediment that affects reefs in the area. During the winter, some cold fronts come from North America, with low temperatures and strong northerly winds. It is also common that cold currents coming down from the Arctic seabed emerge when they hit the island shelf.

Airport
Osvaldo Virgil Airport is an airport in the Dominican Republic. It serves the city and province of Monte Cristi, in the north of the country. It was out of service for a long time and was put into operation in 2007 after being remodeled by the DA (Airport Department). He was named Osvaldo Virgil, the first Dominican baseball player in the Major Leagues, born in Monte Cristi. Its track and facilities were built under the direction of Montecristeño engineer Manuel Isidor.

Culture
Within the traditions of the province, the patron saint festivities of San Fernando stand out, which are celebrated every May 30 with religious acts, as well as sporting events, dances, bag runs, a fishing tournament, etc.

Also the celebration of the day of San Juan Bautista, on June 24 and the Carnival of the Bulls, events that are very crowded. One of its main cultural heritages is the first pyramid of territorial division between the Dominican Republic and Haiti.

See also
Osvaldo Virgil Airport
Monte Cristi Pipe Wreck
Monte Cristi National Park

References

External links
OpenStreetMap - Monte Cristi
Google Maps - Monte Cristi

Populated places in Monte Cristi Province
Municipalities of the Dominican Republic
Populated places established in 1506
1506 establishments in the Spanish Empire